Tomer is an Israeli settlement organized as a moshav in the West Bank. Located in the Jordan Valley next to the Palestinian village of Fasayil, it falls under the jurisdiction of Bik'at HaYarden Regional Council.

The international community considers Israeli settlements in the West Bank illegal under international law, but the Israeli government disputes this.

History
According to ARIJ, Israel confiscated 1,049 dunams of land from the Palestinian village of Fasayil in order to construct Tomer.

The village was established in 1976, and was named after the trees common in the area. In March 1978 it moved to its present location near Highway 90.

References

Moshavim
Israeli settlements in the West Bank
Populated places established in 1976
1976 establishments in the Israeli Military Governorate